State Road 275 (NM 275) is a  state highway in the US state of New Mexico. NM 275's southern terminus is at NM 209 in Broadview, and the northern terminus is at NM 469 north of Wheatland.

Major intersections

See also

References

275
Transportation in Curry County, New Mexico
Transportation in Quay County, New Mexico